Ambagarathur is a revenue city in the Thirunallar taluk of Karaikal District in the Indian union territory of Puducherry.  It is situated to the west of Thirunallar. Ambagarathur is 8.3 km distance from its Tensil Main Town Thirunallar . Ambagarathur is 12.9 km distance from its District Headquarters Karaikal . And 108 km distance from its State Main City Pondicherry. The place is famous for BhadraKali amman Temple.

External links 

 http://wikimapia.org/12813586/Ambagarathur-kali-amman-temple
 https://web.archive.org/web/20130904043430/http://www.ambagarathurkali.com/ambagarathur-temple-travel-information.php
 http://jaghamani.blogspot.com/2011/06/blog-post_08.html
 http://ambagarathur.webs.com/
 https://web.archive.org/web/20120818163256/http://ambaireport.webs.com/
 http://ambagarathur.blogspot.ae/

References 

 
 

Villages in Karaikal district